Balnaves may refer to:

People
Henry Balnaves, (1512?– 1570), Scottish politician and religious reformer
Neil Balnaves (1944–2022), Australian media executive and arts philanthropist
Victoria Balnaves, actress in Scottish TV series Two Doors Down

Other uses
Balnaves Chair in Constitutional Law at the Indigenous Law Centre at UNSW, Sydney, Australia
Balnaves Fellowship, formerly Balnaves Award, at Belvoir St Theatre, Sydney, Australia
Balnaves development project, an Australian oil field, one of many oil megaprojects (2014)
Balnaves Foundation, an Australian philanthropic institution founded by Neil Balnaves
Balnaves Foundation Multimedia Learning Centre at Bond University at Robina, Queensland, Australia

See also
Balnaves Contemporary Series, at the National Gallery of Australia